This is a list of the National Register of Historic Places listings in Erie County, New York.

This is intended to be a complete list of the properties and districts on the National Register of Historic Places in Niagara County, New York, United States. The locations of National Register properties and districts (at least for all showing latitude and longitude coordinates below) may be seen in a map by clicking on "Map of all coordinates".

There are 97 properties and districts listed on the National Register in the county. The city of Niagara Falls is the location of 36 of these properties and districts; they are listed separately, while 61 properties and districts outside Niagara Falls are listed here.



Current listings

Niagara Falls

Elsewhere

|}

See also

National Register of Historic Places listings in New York

References

Niagara County